65th parallel may refer to:

65th parallel north, a circle of latitude in the Northern Hemisphere
65th parallel south, a circle of latitude in the Southern Hemisphere